Praetrigoniophthalmus is a genus of jumping bristletails in the family Machilidae. There are at least two described species in Praetrigoniophthalmus.

Species
These two species belong to the genus Praetrigoniophthalmus:
 Praetrigoniophthalmus kuhnelti Janetschek, 1954
 Praetrigoniophthalmus meticulosa (Silvestri, 1904)

References

Further reading

 
 
 
 
 

Archaeognatha
Articles created by Qbugbot